Emiliano Ellacopulos (born January 14, 1992) is a Greek-Argentine footballer who plays for Ferro Carril Oeste in the Primera B Nacional.

Club career
Ellacopulos started his career in Club Atlético Tigre academy and he jumped to the first team after spending some years there. During 2015–16 season, Ellacopulos played for the Greek side Kalloni F.C.  on loan from Tigre.

Personal life
His father is of Greek descent, his mother of Argentine descent and he was born in Tigre.

External links

1992 births
Living people
Argentine people of Greek descent
Argentine footballers
Club Atlético Tigre footballers
Unión de Santa Fe footballers
AEL Kalloni F.C. players
Aldosivi footballers
Instituto footballers
Club Atlético Temperley footballers
Ferro Carril Oeste footballers
Argentine Primera División players
Primera Nacional players
Super League Greece players
Argentine expatriate footballers
Argentine expatriate sportspeople in Greece
Expatriate footballers in Greece
Association football wingers
People from Tigre, Buenos Aires
Sportspeople from Buenos Aires Province